Invergowrie is a locality in the Uralla Shire local government area on the Northern Tablelands of New South Wales, Australia. It is located about 16 km west of Armidale, about halfway between Sydney and Brisbane and approximately 200 km inland from Coffs Harbour on the Pacific coast. Invergowrie is a popular rural neighbourhood for staff of the University of New England. It has a general store, a fuel station and a New South Wales Rural Fire Service station.

Invergowrie was named after the village Invergowrie in Scotland.

References

Towns in New South Wales
Towns in New England (New South Wales)